Pedro González is one of the Pearl Islands of Panama. It is a corregimiento in Balboa District, Panamá Province with a population of 263 as of 2010, mostly in the village of Pedro de Cocal. Its population as of 1990 was 440; its population as of 2000 was 247.

It is served by Fernando Eleta Airport.

References

Corregimientos of Panamá Province